Weitenhagen is a municipality in the Vorpommern-Greifswald district, in Mecklenburg-Western Pomerania, Germany. The former municipality Diedrichshagen was merged into Weitenhagen in May 2019.

References

Vorpommern-Greifswald